The Hurunui by-election 1961 was a by-election held in the  electorate in North Canterbury during the term of the 33rd New Zealand Parliament, on 10 June 1961.

The by-election was caused by the death of incumbent MP William Gillespie of the National Party on 23 April 1961.

Candidates
Labour
The Labour Party selected Arthur Alexander Adcock as its candidate. Adcock, a railway worker, was secretary of the local Amalgamated Society of Railway Servants branch and a member of the Waimairi County Council. He had contested the seat in 1960 against Gillespie.

National
There were several names put forward as potential nominees for the National Party candidacy:

William Murray Dailey, a farmer at Oxford and chairman of the Oxford County Council
J. A. G. Fulton, a farmer at Loburn and former chairman of the Sefton and districts branch of Federated Farmers
Clutha N. McKenzie, a farmer at Motunau and chairman of Waipara County Council (grandson of Sir Thomas Mackenzie)
W. W. Wood, a land agent and bookshop proprietor at Rangiora who was a committee member of the Rangiora National Party

Ultimately Pickering was chosen to contest the seat.

Social Credit
The Social Credit Party selected Malcolm Jack Clark, an engineer from Waikari, as its candidate for the seat.

Results
The following table gives the election results:

The by-election was won by Lorrie Pickering.

Notes

References

Hurunui 1961
1961 elections in New Zealand
Politics of Canterbury, New Zealand
June 1961 events in New Zealand